Histone deacetylase 3 is an enzyme encoded by the HDAC3 gene in both humans and mice.

Function 

Histones are highly alkaline proteins that package and order DNA into structural units called nucleosomes, which comprise the major protein component of chromatin. The posttranslational and enzymatically mediated lysine acetylation and deacetylation of histone tails changes the local chromatin structure through altering the electrostatic attraction between the negatively charged DNA backbone and histones. HDAC3 is a Class I member of the histone deacetylase superfamily (comprising four classes based on function and DNA sequence homology) that is recruited to enhancers to modulate both the epigenome and nearby gene expression. HDAC3 is found exclusively in the cell nucleus where it is the sole endogenous histone deacetylase biochemically purified in the nuclear-receptor corepressor complex containing NCOR and SMRT (NCOR2). Thus, HDAC3 unlike other HDACs, has a unique role in modulating the transcriptional activities of nuclear receptors.

Alternative functions

Histone deacetylases can be regulated by endogenous factors, dietary components, synthetic inhibitors and bacteria-derived signals. Studies in mice with a specific 
deletion of HDAC3 in intestinal epithelial cells (IECs) show a deregulated IEC's gene expression. In these deletion-mutant mice, loss of Paneth cells, impaired IEC function and alterations in intestinal composition of commensal bacteria were observed. These negative effects were not observed in germ-free mice, indicating that the effects of the deletion are only seen in the presence of intestinal microbial colonization. But the negative effects of HDAC3 deletion are not due to the presence of an altered microbiota because normal germ-free mice colonized with the altered microbiota did not show the negative effects seen in deletion mutants.

Although the precise mechanism and the specific signals are not known it is clear that HDAC3 interacts with derived signals of commensal bacteria of the gut microbiota. These interactions are responsible of calibrating epithelial cells responses necessary to establish a normal relationship between the host and the commensal as well as to maintain intestinal homeostasis.

Model organisms

Model organisms have been used in the study of HDAC3 function. A conditional knockout mouse line, called Hdac3tm1a(EUCOMM)Wtsi was generated as part of the International Knockout Mouse Consortium program, a high-throughput mutagenesis project to generate and distribute animal models of disease to interested scientists.

Male and female animals underwent a standardized phenotypic screen to determine the effects of deletion.

Twenty six tests were carried out on  mutant  mice and two significant abnormalities were observed. No homozygous mutant embryos were identified during gestation, and in a separate study none survived until weaning. The remaining tests were carried out on heterozygous mutant adult mice; no significant abnormalities were observed in these animals.

Interactions
HDAC3 has been shown to interact with:

 CBFA2T3, 
 CCND1, 
 GATA1, 
 GATA2, 
 GPS2, 
 GTF2I, 
 HDAC4, 
 HDAC5, 
 HDAC7A, 
 HDAC9, 
 MAP3K7IP2, 
 MAPK11, 
 NCOR1, 
 NCOR2, 
 PPARD, 
 PPARG, 
 PML 
 RBBP4, 
 RELA, 
 RP, 
 RUNX2, 
 SUV39H1, 
 TCP1, 
 TBL1X, 
 TR2, 
 UBC,
 YY1,  and
 ZBTB33.

See also
 Histone deacetylase

References

Further reading

External links 
 

EC 3.5.1
Genes mutated in mice